Perry Stone may refer to:
 Perry Stone (radio personality)
 Perry Stone (minister)